Jeroen Bleekemolen (born 23 October 1981 in Heemstede) is a Dutch professional racing driver. In the Chrysler Viper GTS-R he drove in the FIA GT Championship, with great success. He competed in the very competitive German Formula Three Championship and drove a number of times at the Masters of Formula 3 at Circuit Zandvoort, the unofficial F3 World Championship. Together with Opel he raced in the DTM. In 2005 Bleekemolen won the ELF BRL V6 championship.

Jeroen Bleekemolen was the first driver for A1 Team Netherlands in the A1 Grand Prix series after replacing Jos Verstappen. Bleekemolen was a backup driver in the first season. He also participated, and took a class victory, in the 2008 24 Hours of Le Mans race, driving the Van Merksteijn Motorsport's LMP2 class Porsche RS Spyder.

Bleekemolen is the son of former Formula One driver Michael Bleekemolen.

Racing record

Complete Deutsche Tourenwagen Masters results
(key)

‡ - Shanghai was a non-championship round.

Complete Porsche Supercup results
(key) (Races in bold indicate pole position) (Races in italics indicate fastest lap)

‡ Not eligible for points.

Complete A1 Grand Prix results
(key) (Races in bold indicate pole position) (Races in italics indicate fastest lap)

Complete 24 Hours of Le Mans results

Complete European Le Mans Series results
(key) (Races in bold indicate pole position; races in italics indicate fastest lap)

Touring car racing

V8 Supercar results

† Not Eligible for points

Bathurst 1000 results

Complete Blancpain GT Series Sprint Cup results

Complete IMSA SportsCar Championship results
(key) (Races in bold indicate pole position) (Races in italics indicate fastest lap)

† Points only counted towards the Michelin Endurance Cup, and not the overall LMP3 Championship.
* Season still in progress.

Complete FIA World Endurance Championship results
(key) (Races in bold indicate pole position) (Races in italics indicate fastest lap)

External links

Driver for Reiter Engineering
Driver for the Viper Exchange

1981 births
Living people
Dutch racing drivers
Deutsche Tourenwagen Masters drivers
A1 Team Netherlands drivers
FIA GT Championship drivers
24 Hours of Le Mans drivers
Formula Palmer Audi drivers
Formula Ford drivers
People from Heemstede
24 Hours of Daytona drivers
American Le Mans Series drivers
European Le Mans Series drivers
EFDA Nations Cup drivers
Rolex Sports Car Series drivers
Porsche Supercup drivers
Supercars Championship drivers
FIA World Endurance Championship drivers
Blancpain Endurance Series drivers
International GT Open drivers
ADAC GT Masters drivers
V8SuperTourer drivers
Stock Car Brasil drivers
WeatherTech SportsCar Championship drivers
24 Hours of Spa drivers
24H Series drivers
GT World Challenge America drivers
Sportspeople from North Holland
Murphy Prototypes drivers
A1 Grand Prix drivers
AF Corse drivers
Rebellion Racing drivers
Stone Brothers Racing drivers
Walter Lechner Racing drivers
Kolles Racing drivers
Audi Sport drivers
Mercedes-AMG Motorsport drivers
Porsche Motorsports drivers
Rowe Racing drivers
Phoenix Racing drivers
Van Amersfoort Racing drivers
Nürburgring 24 Hours drivers
Michelin Pilot Challenge drivers
Le Mans Cup drivers
GT4 European Series drivers
Porsche Carrera Cup Germany drivers